Francesco "Frank" Lentini (May 18, 1889 − September 21, 1966) was an Italian-American sideshow performer who toured with numerous circuses. Born with a parasitic twin, Lentini had three legs.

Early life
Lentini was born at 8 Gintoli Street, Rosolini, Sicily, on May 18, 1889. Delivered by midwife Maria Alberino, he was the fifth of 12 children (seven sisters and five brothers) in his family. Disgraced initially, his parents gave him into the care of the wife of his uncle Corrido Falco. At four months old he was sent to be examined by a specialist in Naples. By age five he was playing with other children and was able to straighten his third leg, but not walk. He became known for having three legs, four feet, and two sets of genitals.

Lentini was born with a parasitic twin. The twin was attached to his body at the base of his spine and consisted of a pelvic bone, a rudimentary set of male genitalia, and a full-sized leg extending from the right side of his hip, with a small foot protruding from its knee.

Sideshow career
He was exhibited in numerous cities, including London, in 1897.  When he was eight, Magnano, who ran a travelling puppet show, brought him to Middletown and Lentini's family moved to the United States. Lentini then entered the sideshow business as The Great Lentini, joining the Ringling Brothers Circus. He gained US citizenship at the age of 30. His career spanned over 40 years and he worked with every major circus and sideshow, including Barnum and Bailey and Buffalo Bill's Wild West Show. Lentini was so respected among his peers that he was often called "The King".

In his youth, Lentini used his third leg to kick a football across the stage—hence his show name, the Three-Legged Football Player.

Lentini's normal legs were slightly different in length: one was 39 inches and the other 38 inches. The third leg was only 36 inches and ended in a clubfoot. As an adult, his primary legs remained of different lengths while his extra leg was several inches shorter. He complained that, even with three legs, he still did not have a pair. In 1907 he married Theresa Murray, three years younger than him, and they had four children: Giuseppina (Josephine), Natale (Ned), Francesco (Frank) Junior, and Giacomo (James). When Frank and Theresa separated around 1935, he began a new life with Helen Shupe, with whom he lived until his death. Lentini died of lung failure in Jackson, Tennessee, on September 21, 1966, at the age of 77.

Legacy
Lentini is closely related to strongman/film-maker Christopher Annino. Jonathan Redavid portrayed him in the 2017 film The Greatest Showman.

Frank Lentini is featured on the back cover of Seattle-based rock band Alice in Chains' self-titled 1995 album.

References

External links

James G. Mundie, "The Life History of Francesco A. Lentini, Three-legged Wonder" pitchbook pamphlet (with photos)
J. Tithonus Pednaud, Francesco Lentini – The Three-Legged Man

1889 births
1966 deaths
People from Castelbuono
Sideshow performers
People with parasitic twins
People with supernumerary body parts
Italian emigrants to the United States